Rakhiv (see also other names) is a city located in Zakarpattia Oblast (province) in western Ukraine. It is the administrative center of Rakhiv Raion (district). Population: .

Rakhiv's date of the foundation is often taken to be 1447, although a written mentions of this settlement are attested since AD 910.

Names
There are several alternative names used for this city: ; ; ; ; ;  or Rakhyv; ; ; .

Demographics 

As of 2017, the city population was  inhabitants.

Features 

Rakhiv, or more precisely, the village Dilove located close to it, is one of several European locations vying for the symbolic right to be Geographical centre of Europe. The sign in Dilove, the point calculated in 1887 by the Austro-Hungarian geographers, carries a Latin inscription: "Locus Perennis Dilicentissime cum libella librationis quae est in Austria et Hungaria confectacum mensura gradum meridionalium et paralleloumierum Europeum. MD CCC LXXXVII."

There was Thomas Garrigue Masaryk in his stay to study a situation on the Romanian front during World War I in Hotel "Ukraina" on the winter 1917 - 1918, which remind the memorial desk there. 

The Headquarters of Carpathian Biosphere Reserve are located in Rakhiv.

With an elevation of 430 meters above sea level, Rakhiv is  Ukraine's highest city.

Climate
The climate in Rakhiv is a mild/cool summer subtype (Köppen: Dfb) of the humid continental climate.

Twin town
 Bielsk Podlaski, Poland
 Szeged, Hungary

People from Rakhiv
Mickola Vorokhta, the Ukrainian artist was born here.

Gallery

References

External links 
 
City of Rakhiv Informational portal
Rakhiv in the Encyclopedia of Ukraine

Cities in Zakarpattia Oblast
Cities of district significance in Ukraine
1477 establishments in Europe
15th-century establishments in Ukraine